David J. Langer is American neurosurgeon who is chair of neurosurgery at Lenox Hill Hospital in New York City. In addition, he is a professor of neurosurgery and radiology at the Donald and Barbara Zucker School of Medicine at Hofstra/Northwell. Langer was a star on the 2020 Netflix docu-series, Lenox Hill.

Langer has made appearances on several news programs including CNN, Fox News, ABC News, and CBS, and has written articles for The New York Times and The Wall Street Journal. In addition. Langer is a peer reviewer for medical journals, Neurosurgery and World Neurosurgery.

History 
David Jonathan Langer was born on June 18, 1963 to parents Terry and Joan Langer.

Langer attended the University of Pennsylvania for his bachelor's degree and later attended the University of Pennsylvania Perelman School of Medicine for his Medical degree, graduating in 1991.

As an undergraduate medical student and neurological surgical resident at University of Pennsylvania, Langer worked with Kate Kariko PhD. Langer published 2 articles with Kariko in 1998 and 2001 which represents some of the early mRNA delivery work which ultimately led Kariko to publish the work that led directly to the development of the Moderna and BioNTech mRNA COVID-19 vaccines.

Langer started his residency in neurological surgery at the Hospital of the University of Pennsylvania from 1992 to 1998, later completing fellowships at Mount Sinai Beth Israel and University at Buffalo.

Langer was recruited by Northwell Health in 2013 to establish a neurosurgery department at Lenox Hill Hospital. His mission was to develop a neurosurgery department at the hospital. Since then, the department has evolved to land Lenox Hill Hospital among U.S. News & World Report's top 50 hospitals for neurology and neurosurgery. He also maintains an active practice in spinal disease and benign brain tumors, including acoustic neuromas and meningiomas.

In January 2018, Langer cofounded Playback Health with Gregory Odland. Playback is a mobile platform application that allows health care providers to use their mobile phones to curate structured EMR, create audio, video and text unstructured content and share to the patient, family and care team. As of December 2020, Playback has raised $3 million.

In August 2019, Langer was relaxing on a beach in Amagansett, New York when a fellow beachgoer fell off of his surfboard and could no longer feel his limbs. Langer rushed to help the man and stabilized his neck with boogie boards, motivating the man to try and move his toes. He ultimately ended up operating on him and stabilizing his spine. 

In 2020 Langer starred in the Netflix docu-series, Lenox Hill, a Netflix Original that shadowed four doctors in the areas of neurosurgery, emergency medicine, and obstetrics and gynecology at the Lenox Hill Hospital. The series provides a real-life look into his role as a neurosurgeon and chief of neurosurgery in a rising New York City neuro program. Langer starred on the docu-series along with his vice-chair of neurosurgery, Dr. John Boockvar.

During the 2020 COVID-19 pandemic, Langer was reassigned to help cover the COVID-19 unit at Lenox Hill. He went to the temporary hospital at the Jacob K. Javits Convention Center to help out and pick up shifts.

See also 

 Lenox Hill
 Lenox Hill Hospital
 University of Pennsylvania Perelman School of Medicine

References

External links 
 

Northwell Health
University of Pennsylvania alumni
Perelman School of Medicine at the University of Pennsylvania alumni
American neurosurgeons
Living people
Hofstra University faculty
1963 births